Samantha Jade Gibbs (born 18 April 1987) is an Australian singer and songwriter. She has written tracks for artists including JoJo and Ashley Tisdale. In 2012, Jade won the fourth season of The X Factor Australia, the first woman to win the Australian series. She subsequently signed with Sony Music Australia and released her winner's single "What You've Done to Me", which debuted at number one on the ARIA Singles Chart.

Early life
Samantha Jade Gibbs was born in Perth, Western Australia. Her father, Kevin Gibbs is of Anglo-Indian descent, while her mother, Jacqueline Deans Gibbs was of Scottish descent. Her mother died on 8 June 2014 after a short battle with cancer. Jade began modelling at the age of four and at age nine she won a talent show after singing "Amazing Grace". She attended Good Shepherd Catholic Primary School in Kiara, and Hampton Senior High School in Morley.

Career

2002–2010: Beginnings

In 2002, Jade's friend sent her demo to a record producer in Los Angeles, California, who then decided to send Jade and her family to Hollywood for a meeting. The following year, they moved to Los Angeles. In 2004, she signed with US record label Jive Records and began recording a few demo tracks. That year, a song she co-wrote, "Secret Love", was recorded by JoJo for the soundtrack of the 2004 film Shark Tale.

In 2006, Jade recorded the title track "Step Up" for the 2006 dance film Step Up. The song was written by Diane Warren and produced by rapper Wyclef Jean. The single which had little promotion appeared for one week on the Billboard Pop 100 peaking at number 92. In 2007, Jade released her follow-up single "Turn Around". It was sent to mainstream radio in the United States on 14 August 2007, as the lead single from Jade's debut album, My Name is Samantha Jade. Upon initial release, "Turn Around" debuted and peaked at number 83 on the ARIA Singles Chart, but upon Jade winning the fourth season of The X Factor in 2012, the song re-entered and peaked at number 53. After three years with the label, My Name is Samantha Jade was never released. In 2007 Jade co-wrote and sang back-up vocals on the track "Positivity" on Ashley Tisdale's debut album Headstrong. The following year, Jade co-wrote and sang back-up vocals on the song "Can't Walk Away" on Tiffany Evans' album Tiffany Evans.

Jade was later dropped from Jive Records and attempted to continue to work on music independently with American record label Affinity West Entertainment. Jade recorded the controversial Golden Touch album for the label which would later result in issues regarding the release of the album, as it wasn't released until 2012. In 2010, Jade made her acting debut in the film Beneath the Blue, a sequel to Eye of the Dolphin. The film was released in 2009. Jade notably recorded a track the following year with David Guetta and Laidback Luke for David Guetta's fourth studio album One Love which was released in August. The track did not make the final track-listing but is featured as a bonus track on certain international releases. In July 2009 Jade released her third single, "Secret", in Australia, which failed to chart. The official music video for the single was directed by Valerie Babayan. The video for "Secret" shows her narrowing down an old lover so she can confront them about their "Secret". In 2010, Jade relocated to Perth and began working at her father's mining factory counting stock.

2012: The X Factor Australia and Samantha Jade 

In a final attempt to return to the music industry, Jade successfully auditioned for the fourth season of The X Factor in 2012, singing The Script's "Breakeven", during which judge Guy Sebastian notably teared up. Jade progressed to the super bootcamp stage of the competition, where she sang "It Ain't Over 'til It's Over" by Lenny Kravitz and "No Air" by Jordin Sparks. She then advanced to the home visits round as part of the Over 25s category, which was mentored by Sebastian. He later selected Jade, along with Justin Standley and Nathaniel Willemse, for the live finals—a series of ten weekly live shows in which contestants are progressively eliminated by public vote.

For the first live performance show on 17 September 2012, she sang Katy Perry's "Wide Awake" and received praise from all four judges. Keating said "I'm going to get in trouble for saying this but that was better than Katy Perry", while Sebastian added that "Every singer in the country just literally went 'Oh my gosh'." However, Jade fell into the bottom two alongside Adil Memon but was saved after Keating, Bassingthwaighte and Sebastian all opted to eliminate Memon. In the fifth week, Jade fell into the bottom two alongside Angel Tupai. After they received two votes each, the result was deadlock and reverted to the earlier public vote leading to Tupai receiving the fewest votes and being eliminated. In the seventh week, Jade fell into the bottom two alongside Willemse but was saved via deadlock.

In the semi-finals of the competition, Jade sang "Heartless" and "Where Have You Been", she advanced to the finals. During the grand final decider, on 20 November 2012, Jade was announced as the winner. She received a recording contract with record label Sony Music Australia and a Nissan Dualis car.

 denotes having entered the ARIA Singles Chart.  denotes having been in the bottom two.  denotes winner.

After winning The X Factor, Jade's winner's single "What You've Done to Me" was released digitally via iTunes. After three days of release, the song debuted at number one on the ARIA Singles Chart. It was certified triple platinum by the Australian Recording Industry Association (ARIA), denoting sales of 210,000 copies. Jade's self-titled debut album was released on 7 December 2012, featuring re-recorded versions of the songs she performed on The X Factor. The album debuted at number three on the ARIA Albums Chart and was certified gold, denoting shipments of 35,000 copies.

On 5 December 2012, Jade's former record label Camp West Recorders released her original first album The Golden Touch on iTunes without Jade or Sony Music's permission. Camp West Recorders Inc. company presidents John Harris and Ty Knox sued Jade for damages and alleged contract breaches as well as Sony Music, Parade Artists, FremantleMedia Australia and Simon Cowell's Syco Entertainment. Harris and Knox claimed that they were entitled to a share of Jade's income because they signed a development deal with her when she moved to Los Angeles at age 15 to launch a music career, and that Camp West's contract with her was still valid. The pair also claimed they spent $2 million developing her as an artist.

2013–2016: INXS: Never Tear Us Apart, Nine and Home and Away
 
In January 2013, Jade headlined The X Factor Live Tour performing shows in the Gold Coast, Sydney, Melbourne, Adelaide and Perth. The lead single from Jade's second studio album, Firestarter, was released on 28 June 2013. It debuted and peaked at number nine on the ARIA Singles Chart and was certified Platinum, for selling 70,000 copies. Jade co-designed her own jewellery line with Diva accessories. In August 2013, Jade performed in Indonesia for RCTI's 24th anniversary television special, X Factor Around the World, along with The Collective, Jahméne Douglas, Melanie Amaro, Novita Dewi and Fatin Shidqia. Jade performed "Firestarter" in the first week of the fifth season of The X Factor. During her performance on The X Factor, it was announced that Jade is working on her second album. She won 'Best Video' for "Firestarter" at the 27th ARIA Music Awards. Jade released a second single from her upcoming album, entitled "Soldier" on 15 November 2013, which peaked at number 17 and was later certified Gold, for selling 35,000 copies.

On 24 January 2014, Jade released a cover of "I Am Australian" with Dami Im, Jessica Mauboy, Justice Crew, Nathaniel Willemse and Taylor Henderson, to coincide with the Australia Day celebrations. The song peaked at number 51 on the ARIA Singles Chart. Jade played Kylie Minogue in the mini-series INXS: Never Tear Us Apart, televised on the Seven Network in February 2014. Jade was nominated for "Most Popular New Talent" at the Logie awards for the role. Jade released a third single from her second album on 11 April 2014,  entitled "Up!". It peaked at number 18 and was later certified Gold, for selling 35,000 copies. On 3 September 2014, Jade performed in Los Angeles as part of Nova FM's Red Room Global Tour.

Jade was the supporting act for One Direction's Australian leg of their On the Road Again Tour in February 2015. On 17 July 2015, Jade released a new single, "Shake That", featuring American rapper Pitbull. It served as the lead single for her long-awaited second studio album. On 5 September 2015, it was announced that Jade had joined the cast of the long-running soap opera Home and Away as Isla Schultz. She made her first appearance during the episode broadcast on 3 March 2016.

Jade's second studio album, Nine, was released on 20 November 2015. Jade confirmed in March 2016 that she is currently working on her third album and is hoping to release it by the end of 2016. It could contain the upcoming singles 'Crushed' and 'Ooh Ooh Ooh' that are mentioned on the Ascap website. In 2016 it was announced that Jade had been cast as Tracey Tyler in the Nine Network mini-series House of Bond.

On 28 October 2016, Jade announced a new single "Hurt Anymore" in collaboration with Cyrus Villanueva, which was released on 4 November.

2017–2018: Cosmetic line, touring, Best of My Love and The Magic of Christmas

In early 2017 Jade joined the Boyzlife British and England tour. On 6 March 2017 Jade partnered with Models Prefer to launch her debut cosmetic line "Samantha Jade for Models Prefer". On 26 May 2017 Jade released her new single "Circles On the Water".

On 22 February 2018 Jade announced that she will release her third studio album Best of My Love on 20 April 2018.

In November 2018, Jade released her fourth studio album The Magic of Christmas.

2019-Present: Love.Sick Vol. 1 EP
In early 2019, Jade confirmed she is working on her fifth studio album, the album is expected to have original material. In September 2019, Jade released "Bounce", the lead single from the album, which is due for release in 2020. Discussing the album with Star Observer, she stated that "this time [around], I've asked: 'What are songs I'd listen to?' or 'What are songs that I would save or put on my Spotify or Apple Music?' There are a variety of songs on [the album]. We've got some ballads, we've got some ups ... basically, it's just an array of music that I love. That's what we've really gone with. A lot of the time you chase radio and you chase a sound that's out there [but] I've gone back to what I like and that's really empowering."

She further explained that "It's more about listening to my fanbase and myself. Just going, 'What do my fans like to hear from me?' and I've kind of gone back to a sound that I was inspired by. When I started writing when I was fifteen and moved to LA, I was writing songs because I loved Brandy and TLC and J-Lo, so it all made sense to me." On 31 January 2020, Jade released "In the Morning".

In September 2020, Jade was one of the celebrity faces for Kit Kat's R U OK? Day social media campaign.

Samantha Jade released her latest single "Back 2 Back" on 3 October 2020 and during a Facebook performance confirmed that an album is done. Samantha Jade released another single on 20 November 2020, titled "New Boy". However this album was scrapped in favor of a new EP and Samantha Jade left Sony Music in 2022.

In May 2022, Jade will appear as  a contestant on the sixth season of The Celebrity Apprentice Australia.

On 17 June 2022, Jade released "Dance Again". "Dance Again" is Jade's first release with Midnight Records .

In November Jade confirmed the release of EP Love Sick, scheduled for release on 25 November 2022.

Artistry
Jade is a light-lyric soprano and cites Beyoncé, Robyn and Mariah Carey as her musical influences.
Her debut original album was a pop record. She describes "Nine" as personal, and she felt like she was playing a character on her Best Of My Love album of disco covers. Her voice is breezy and bright. She has an angelic voice and co-wrote parts of Nine, "Born to Be Alive" and "Wait for It" are considered poppy

Personal life
Jade previously lived in Los Angeles to pursue her singing career. After struggling to get a new record deal in the United States, she moved back to Perth and began working at her father's warehouse in Guildford, Western Australia. She later relocated to Sydney, where she was a makeup artist while still gigging. In early 2019, Jade announced her engagement to Pat Handlin, the son of Denis Handlin, the disgraced former CEO of Sony Music Australia.

Concert tours
Headlining
The X Factor Live Tour (2013)
ChapStick Summer Lovin' Tour (2013)
Only Just Begun Club Tour (2016)
Coca-Cola Christmas Truck Tour (2017)
Best Of My Love Live Tour (2018)
Coca-Cola Salvation Army 'It Feels So Good to Give' Christmas Truck Tour (2018)
Love / Sick Mini Tour (2022)

Supporting
Nova's Red Room Global Tour (Series 1: 2014)
One Direction's On the Road Again Tour: Australian leg (2015)
Boyzlife's Stories - Laughter - Music Tour: UK leg (2017)
Paul Murray's Live in Our Town (2019)
Pentatonix's Pentatonix: The World Tour: Australian & New Zealand leg (2020)

Guest
Guy Sebastian's Get Along Tour: "Art of Love" with Guy Sebastian (Sydney - 20 April 2013)
Beyoncé's The Mrs. Carter Show World Tour: "Breakeven" with Stan Walker (Sydney - 11 November 2013)
Taylor Swift's Red Tour: "Art of Love" with Guy Sebastian (Sydney - 4 December 2013)

Discography

 Samantha Jade (2012)
 Nine (2015)
 Best of My Love (2018)
 The Magic of Christmas (2018)

Filmography

Awards and nominations

References

External links

 

1987 births
21st-century Australian singers
21st-century Australian women singers
Australian contemporary R&B singers
Australian women pop singers
Australian people of Anglo-Indian descent
Australian people of Indian descent
Australian people of Scottish descent
Australian sopranos
Jive Records artists
Living people
Musicians from Perth, Western Australia
Sony BMG artists
Sony Music Australia artists
The X Factor (Australian TV series) contestants
The X Factor winners